Agelasta konoi is a species of beetle in the family Cerambycidae. It was described by Masao Hayashi in 1956.

Subspecies
 Agelasta konoi amamiana (Hayashi, 1962)
 Agelasta konoi konoi (Hayashi, 1962)
 Agelasta konoi kumejimana (Kusama & Takakuwa, 1984)
 Agelasta konoi okinawana (Hayashi, 1960)
 Agelasta konoi okinoerabuensis (Ohbayashi, 1959)

References

konoi
Beetles described in 1956